Metator is a genus of band-winged grasshoppers in the family Acrididae. There are at least two described species in Metator.

Species
These two species belong to the genus Metator:
 Metator nevadensis (Bruner, 1905)
 Metator pardalinus (Saussure, 1884) (blue-legged grasshopper)

References

Further reading

External links

 

Oedipodinae
Articles created by Qbugbot